On 23 November 2018, at least 33 people were killed and 56 others were injured in a suicide bombing in Kalaya, Orakzai District, Khyber Pakhtunkhwa, Pakistan.

On the same day, an armed assault on the Chinese consulate in Karachi, Pakistan resulted in the deaths of four people and the three attackers. However, the two attacks are likely unconnected.

Incident
On 23 November 2018, around 10:30 am PST a bomb blast on Friday in market Kalaya, Orakzai District, Khyber Pakhtunkhwa, Pakistan, the Islamic State – Khorasan Province later claimed responsibility for the bombing. At least 33 people were killed which included three members of the minority Sikh community and 56 others were injured.  However a statement on Amaq, a news outlet associated with ISIL, claimed "57 Shiites were killed and 75 were wounded" in the bombing.

References 

2018 murders in Pakistan
21st-century mass murder in Pakistan
ISIL terrorist incidents in Pakistan
Islamic terrorist incidents in 2018
Marketplace attacks in Asia
Mass murder in 2018
Mass murder in Khyber Pakhtunkhwa
November 2018 crimes in Asia
November 2018 events in Pakistan
2018 bombing
Suicide bombings in 2018
Suicide bombings in Khyber Pakhtunkhwa
Terrorist incidents in Pakistan in 2018